Revising may refer to:

Revise (disambiguation)
Revision (disambiguation)
Study skill